Tomas Gonzales was a Filipino actor and stand-up comedian.

Early life
Born Tomas Casaclang Gonzales II or simply known as Tomas on November 15, 1969.

Career
Tomas got his break as a mainstay in the GMA-7 primetime series "Beauty Queen," as Zuleyka Mamaril, the feisty personal assistant of the Rivases (Katrina Halili and Maggie Wilson). He was also part of the regular cast of the weekly show "Comedy Bar" also on GMA-7 until his death.

Filmography

TV shows

Movie

Death
Stand-up comedian Tomas Gonzales II was found dead in his room Monday night. According to a report from "24 Oras" aired on Tuesday, March 22, Tomas died of a heart attack. Tomas was supposed to have a show at The Library Bar on Tuesday but the scheduled program was turned into a tribute and benefit show for the stand-up comedian.
His remains lie in state at the Galang Memorial Homes in Makati.

References

External links
Tomas Gonzales' website

1969 births
2011 deaths
People from Makati
Filipino male comedians
Filipino LGBT actors
Filipino LGBT comedians